Steenwijksmoer is a village in the Netherlands and it is part of the Coevorden municipality in Drenthe.

It was first mentioned in 1845 as Steenwijks-Moer, and means "the moorland of de Vos family who came from Steenwijk". In 1840, it was home to 252 people.

References

Coevorden
Populated places in Drenthe